Cats, Cats, Cats! is a 2001 Children's picture book by Lesléa Newman and illustrated by Erika Oiler. It is about Mrs Brown, a little old lady, and her 60 cats who snooze all day but then get up to all sorts of mischief at night.

Reception
Reviews of Cats, Cats, Cats! include in Booklist that wrote "Oller's fun-loving watercolors portray all kinds of cats in all manner of positions as the rhyming text reveals the goings on in the zany household."

There have been other reviews by Kirkus Reviews, Publishers Weekly, School Library Journal, and Horn Book Guides.

References

External links
Library holdings of Cats, Cats, Cats!

2001 children's books
American picture books
Books about cats